Majerhat is a locality in Kolkata, India. It may refer to the following locations in the area:
 Majerhat Bridge - a bridge in the area that collapsed in 2018
 Majerhat railway station - an Indian Eastern Railways train station
 Majerhat metro station - an under-construction metro station on Kolkata Metro Line 3